Black Forest is the third studio album by German recording artist Max Mutzke. It was released by Raab Records and Warner Music Group on 28 November 2008 in German-speaking Europe.

Track listing

Charts

Release history

References

External links
MaxMutzke.de — Official website

2008 albums
Max Mutzke albums